East Timor's Independence Day or Independence Day on 28 November is a national holiday in East Timor held to celebrate independence of the country.

References

East Timorese culture
East Timor
May observances
Observances in East Timor